Arquivo (Portuguese meaning "Archive") was Os Paralamas do Sucesso's first compilation album released in 1990.  It contains the previously unreleased song Caleidoscópio (Kaleidoscope) and the remastered version of one of their greatest hits Vital E Sua Moto

Track listing
"Caleidoscópio" (Herbert Vianna) – 3:31
"Óculos" (Herbert Vianna) – 3:39
"Cinema Mudo" (Herbert Vianna) – 3:47
"Alagados" (Herbert Vianna, Bi Ribeiro, João Barone) – 5:02
"Lanterna dos Afogados" (Herbert Vianna) – 3:10
"Melô do Marinheiro" (Bi Ribeiro, João Barone) – 3:28
"Vital e Sua Moto" (1990s version) (Herbert Vianna) – 3:30
"O Beco" (Herbert Vianna, Bi Ribeiro, João Barone) – 3:09
"Meu Erro" (Herbert Vianna) – 3:28
"Perplexo" (Herbert Vianna, Bi Ribeiro, João Barone) – 2:41
"Me Liga" (Herbert Vianna) – 3:49
"Quase Um Segundo" (Herbert Vianna) – 4:35
"Selvagem" (Herbert Vianna, Bi Ribeiro, João Barone) – 4:05
"Romance Ideal" (Herbert Vianna, Martin Cardoso) – 4:10
"Será que Vai Chover ?" (Herbert Vianna) – 5:36
"Ska" (Herbert Vianna) –
Tracks 3 and 7 (remastered): Cinema Mudo
Tracks 2, 9, 11, 14 and 16: O Passo do Lui
Tracks 4, 6 and 13: Selvagem?
Tracks 15: D
Tracks 8 and 12: Bora-Bora
Tracks 5 and 10: Big Bang

Personnel 

Humberto Araujo – saxophone
Demetrio Bezerra – trumpet, flugelhorn
Seno Bezerra – trombone
Jorge Davidson – art direction
Vitor Farias – engineer, remixing, remastering
Joao Fera – keyboards
Charly García – piano
Gilberto Gil – vocals
Don Harris – trumpet
Egeu Laus – graphic coordinator
Liminha – guitar, keyboards, producer, remixing, phasing
Armando Marcal – percussion
Matos – trombone
Monteiro Jr – saxophone
Os Paralamas do Sucesso – producer
Carlos Savalla – producer
Claudio Torres – graphic design
Mauricio Valladares – photography

References

Os Paralamas do Sucesso compilation albums
1990 compilation albums
EMI Records compilation albums